"" (I dreamed last night) is a German folk song. It is a melancholic song that tells of a disturbing dream foreshadowing death – a rosemary tree in the garden, falling leaves, and a jar broken to pieces and bleeding a red liquid. In Northern Germany, rosemary was planted in graveyards, and mourners at funerals would sometimes wear rosemary stalks.

History 
It is unknown when the song was first popularized, but the melody was first written and published in 1777 by Friedrich Nicolai in Eyn feyner kleyner Almanach with the text of "" (A hunter wanted to go hunting). Other versions using the same melody but different lyrics included "" (The leaves fall from the trees) by Siegfried August Mahlmann in 1804/1805, "" (Beautiful children love), and "" (In Koblenz on the bridge).

The best-known and most widely used lyrics to the melody were written by German preacher and collector of folk songs August Zarnack. Zarnack's version was originally published under the title "" (The heavy dream), and appeared in Zarnack's 1820 book which was a collection of German folk songs intended for primary schools. Zarnack's textbook sold well, and in the 1840s and onwards, "Ich hab die Nacht geträumet" was increasingly included in other music workbooks as well for schools and choirs.

Lyrics

Musical settings 
Johannes Brahms wrote a choral version of the song between 1859 and 1862. Max Reger published two versions for choir a cappella, in 1898 a setting for men's chorus choral (TTBB) as No. 5 of WoO VI/6, and in 1899 a setting for mixed choir as No. 4 of WoO VI/11. In 2004, the German band Heimatærde released its first  EP named after the song, including two versions of it.  The 2016 video game Civilization VI uses four versions of the song as its theme for the German civilization.

References

External links 
 Sheet music
 Text and MIDI version, ingeb.org

Volkslied
18th-century songs